The 47th National Society of Film Critics Awards, given on 5 January 2013, honored the best in film for 2012.

47th NSFC Awards
January 5, 2013

Best Film:
 Amour

Winners 
Film titles are listed in order of placings:

Best Picture 
1. Amour 
2. The Master 
3. Zero Dark Thirty

Best Director 
1. Michael Haneke – Amour 
2. Kathryn Bigelow – Zero Dark Thirty 
2. Paul Thomas Anderson – The Master

Best Actor 
1. Daniel Day-Lewis – Lincoln 
2. Denis Lavant – Holy Motors 
2. Joaquin Phoenix – The Master

Best Actress 
1. Emmanuelle Riva – Amour 
2. Jennifer Lawrence – Silver Linings Playbook 
3. Jessica Chastain – Zero Dark Thirty

Best Supporting Actor 
1. Matthew McConaughey – Bernie and Magic Mike 
2. Tommy Lee Jones – Lincoln 
3. Philip Seymour Hoffman – The Master

Best Supporting Actress 
1. Amy Adams – The Master 
2. Sally Field – Lincoln 
3. Anne Hathaway – Les Misérables

Best Screenplay 
1. Tony Kushner – Lincoln 
2. Paul Thomas Anderson – The Master 
3. David O. Russell – Silver Linings Playbook

Best Cinematography 
1. Mihai Mălaimare Jr. – The Master 
2. Roger Deakins – Skyfall 
3. Greig Fraser – Zero Dark Thirty

Best Non-Fiction Film 
1. The Gatekeepers 
2. This Is Not a Film 
3. Searching for Sugar Man

Best Experimental Film 
This Is Not a Film

Film Heritage Awards 
 Laurence Kardish, senior film curator at the Museum of Modern Art, for his extraordinary 44 years of service, including this year's Weimar Cinema retrospective.
 Milestone Film and Video for its ongoing "Project Shirley".

References

2012 film awards
2012
2013 in American cinema